Dyschirius beludscha is a species of ground beetle in the subfamily Scaritinae. It was described by Tschitscherine in 1904.

References

beludscha
Beetles described in 1904